Postville Community School District is a public school district headquartered in Postville, Iowa.

It operates Cora B. Darling Elementary School, named after a teacher, and Postville Junior-Senior High School, also known as John R. Mott High School, named for John R. Mott, the 1946 winner of the Nobel Peace Prize.

The district occupies sections of four counties: Allamakee, Clayton, Fayette, and Winneshiek, and serves the city of Postville, and surrounding rural areas.

Demographics
Circa 1999, the high school had about 205 students. , about 45% of the students at the elementary school were of Mexican or Central American origin.

Enrollment

References

External links
 Postville Community School District
 
 Postville Community School District Map - Iowa Department of Education

See also
List of school districts in Iowa

School districts in Iowa
Education in Allamakee County, Iowa
Education in Clayton County, Iowa
Education in Fayette County, Iowa
Education in Winneshiek County, Iowa